The tenth South American Junior Championships in Athletics were held in Lima, Peru, at the Estadio Nacional between October 9–13, 1974.

Participation (unofficial)
Detailed result lists can be found on the "World Junior Athletics History" website.  An unofficial count yields the number of about 239 athletes from about 9 countries:  Argentina (44), Bolivia (11), Brazil (40), Chile (29), Colombia (17), Panama (10), Paraguay (11), Peru (45), Venezuela (32).

Medal summary
Medal winners are published for men and women
Complete results can be found on the "World Junior Athletics History" website.

Men

* = another source rather states: Hexathlon

Women

Medal table (unofficial)

References

External links
World Junior Athletics History

South American U20 Championships in Athletics
1974 in Peruvian sport
South American U20 Championships
International athletics competitions hosted by Peru
1974 in youth sport